Sir Ralph Knight (1619 – 21 April 1691) was an English soldier and politician who sat in the House of Commons  in 1660. He served in the Parliamentary army in the English Civil War. He sold 'the Barrels' Manor House in Ullenhal Worcestershire to his cousin to join Cromwell. The Manor had been in the family since the early 1500s.

Knight was the son of William Knight of Newbury who had moved south from Worcestershire, and his wife Alice Worthington. In 1643 he was a Major in Sir Miles Hobart's regiment, commanding a troop of cavalry under the overall command of the Parliamentary General the Earl of Manchester. In 1644 the united armies of Lords Manchester and Fairfax opposed the forces of the Marquis of Newcastle. He was appointed to the New Model Army in 1645 as a captain in the cavalry regiment of Colonel Matthew Tomlinson. By 1647 he had become a major in the same regiment. He became aide-de-camp to General Monck. In about 1650, he purchased the estate of Langold, Yorkshire from Thomas Burton, as a residence for his wife near her relations. He was appointed a Deputy Lieutenant for the West Riding of Yorkshire in 1653. In 1659 he represented Sutherland Ross and Cromarty in the Third Protectorate Parliament.

In 1660, Knight was elected Member of Parliament for Morpeth in the Convention Parliament. He was knighted on the Restoration. In 1662 he purchased the manor of Letwell, Yorkshire. In June 1667 at the time of military emergency he was captain of a company of non-regimental horse raised from the border of Nottinghamshire and Yorkshire. The company marched to Yarmouth in case there was a Dutch invasion, but was  disbanded on 16 August 1667. He became lieutenant-colonel of the Duke of Buckingham's Regiment of Foot on 12 May 1673 and in 1675 he bought the Manor of Warsop in Nottinghamshire.

Family 
Knight married firstly on 23 June 1646, Faith Dickinson, daughter of the Rev. William Dickinson, vicar of Rotherham. He married  secondly, the widow of John Rolleston of Soucam Hall, Nottinghamshire. Rolleston had been the secretary to Sir Ralph's old antagonist, Cavendish, Duke of Newcastle.

His daughter, Bridget, married Richard Taylor, and Taylor's daughter, also Bridget, married Thomas White of Tuxford and Wallingwells, making Sir Ralph Knight a great-great-great-great grandfather of Sir Thomas White, 1st Baronet of Tuxford and Wallingwells.

Another daughter Christian married Jonathan Staniforth of Firbeck Hall.

Death 
Knight died at Firbeck in April 1691 and was buried there on 23 April.

References

1610s births
1691 deaths
English MPs 1659
English MPs 1660
Roundheads
English army officers